Sherra Hillman Lane (born October 27, 1944) is an American attorney and Democratic politician. She is a member of the Mississippi House of Representatives from the 86th District, being first elected in 2004.

References

1944 births
Living people
People from Waynesboro, Mississippi
Women state legislators in Mississippi
Democratic Party members of the Mississippi House of Representatives
21st-century American women